Chernivtsi Raion can refer to a raion (district) of Ukraine,

 Chernivtsi Raion, Chernivtsi Oblast — one of the three raions (districts) in Chernivtsi Oblast, formed in 2020;
 Chernivtsi Raion, Vinnytsia Oblast — a former raion (district) of Vinnytsia Oblast, abolished in 2020,

See also
 Chernivtsi District (1775–1849), Galicia and Lodomeria, Hapsburg Empire